The Applied Science Technologists and Technicians of British Columbia (ASTTBC), is British Columbia's independent certifying body for engineering/applied science technicians and technologists.

ASTTBC confers the post-nominal designations of CTech (Certified Technician), and AScT (Applied Science Technologist) which are symbols of achievement in engineering/applied science technology and are legally protected for use only by fully certified members in good standing. The designations are recognized across Canada by many employers and other engineering professionals through the efforts of provincial associations of engineering technology.

Until 2010, ASTTBC was a member of the Canadian Council of Technicians and Technologists (CCTT).  Through CCTT being a signatory, the Applied Science Technologists and Technicians of British Columbia recognizes international transferability through the Sydney Accord, the Dublin Accord and the Engineering Technology Mobility Forum, which confers the ability to award the designation IntET(Canada) for Technologists who wish to work internationally. In 2010, a number of different provincial associations of engineering technology left CCTT to found Technology Professionals Canada. This leaves the international transferability of these titles in question.

Society of Architectural and Engineering Technologists of BC, was established in 1958, making them one of the first societies of engineering technology. Today, they identify themselves with the name Applied Science Technologists and Technicians of British Columbia.

Certified Engineering Technologists are bound by a specific code of ethics and rules of professional conduct.

In addition to certification, British Columbia is laying the framework for acceptance of a "Professional Technologist" designation similar to Alberta. They are not currently capable of granting the license, but they do recognize licenses from Alberta.

The association is mandated and empowered by the Applied Science Technologists and Technicians Act of British Columbia. However, they are looking to Alberta's "One Act, two organizations" model to better serve the public interest.

Sewage System Regulation
In addition to certifying applied science technologists, ASTTBC has the ability to certify courses regarding sewer systems as acceptable, and the ability to certify individuals as qualified to work on sewage systems, and for setting occupational competencies and accredited programs or courses.

These powers are granted through the Sewerage Regulation Act of British Columbia.

Electrical Field Safety Representative Certification

Applied Science Technologists registered with ASTTBC in the electrical discipline and with acceptable experience are eligible to apply for certification by the British Columbia Safety Authority (BCSA) as a Field Safety Representatives (FSR).

This is provided for under the Electrical Safety Regulations of British Columbia

License to Practice Limited Electrical Work

Certain ASTTBC-registered applied science technologists and certified technicians with suitable electrical experience may apply for certification and then licensing by the British Columbia Safety Authority to perform very specified electrical work within a limited scope.

See also
Engineering technologist
Engineering Technology
The Association of British Columbia Land Surveyors

References

External links
The Applied Science Technologists and Technicians of British Columbia official page

Professional associations based in British Columbia
Surrey, British Columbia
Engineering societies based in Canada